Battery B, 1st Illinois Light Artillery Regiment was an artillery battery that served in the Union Army during the American Civil War.

Service
Battery B was mustered into service at Chicago, Illinois on May 2, 1861 for three months' service.  The battery was re-mustered for three years service at Cairo, Illinois on July 16, 1861.

The battery was mustered out on July 23, 1864 at Chicago, Illinois. Veterans and recruits were transferred to Battery A, 1st Illinois Light Artillery Regiment. The battery was recreated in March, 1865 by the redesignation of Bridges' Battery Illinois Light Artillery.

Total strength and casualties
The battery suffered 9 enlisted men who were killed in action or who died of their wounds and 1 officer and 17 enlisted men who died of disease, for a total of 27 fatalities.

Commanders
Captain Ezra Taylor - promoted to major.
Captain Samuel Eddy Barrett - promoted to major.
Captain Israel P. Rumsey - Mustered out with the battery.

See also
List of Illinois Civil War Units
Illinois in the American Civil War

Notes

References
The Civil War Archive

Units and formations of the Union Army from Illinois
Artillery units and formations of the American Civil War
1861 establishments in Illinois
Military units and formations established in 1861
Military units and formations disestablished in 1864